Geoffrey Cowbridge was the member of Parliament for Cricklade in the Parliament of December 1421.

References 

Members of the Parliament of England (pre-1707) for Cricklade
English MPs December 1421
Year of birth unknown
Year of death unknown